In the final, Anastasia Myskina defeated Karolina Šprem to win the first edition of this tournament. This was Myskina's final WTA tour singles title.

Seeds

Draw

Finals

Top half

Bottom half

Qualifying

Seeds

Qualifiers

Draw

First qualifier

Second qualifier

Third qualifier

Fourth qualifier

References

Singles Draw

Sunfeast Open - Singles
Sunfeast Open